The Sambaa Kʼe First Nation is a Dene First Nations band government in the Northwest Territories. The band is headquartered in the community of Sambaa Kʼe, formerly Trout Lake.

The Sambaa Kʼe First Nation is a member of the Dehcho First Nations.

References

First Nations in the Northwest Territories
Dene governments